The 1909 Michigan State Normal Normalites football team was an American football team that represented Michigan State Normal College (later renamed Eastern Michigan University) during the 1909 college football season.  In their first and only season under head coach Clare Hunter, the Normalites compiled a 1–5 record and were outscored by a total of 56 to 33. Allen F. Sherzer was the team captain.

Schedule

References

Michigan State Normal
Eastern Michigan Eagles football seasons
Michigan State Normal Normalites football